Milton HIstoric District may refer to:

Milton Center Historic District, Milton, Connecticut, listed on the National Register of Historic Places (NRHP)
Milton Historic District (Milton, Delaware), NRHP-listed
Milton Historic District (Milton, Florida), NRHP-listed
Milton Centre Historic District, Milton, Massachusetts, NRHP-listed
Milton Hill Historic District, Milton, Massachusetts, NRHP-listed
Milton Historic District (Milton, North Carolina), NRHP-listed
Milton Historic District (Milton, Pennsylvania), NRHP-listed
Milton College Historic District, Milton, Wisconsin, NRHP-listed in Rock County

See also
Milton House (disambiguation)